Charles François Dupuis (26 October 174229 September 1809) was a French savant, a professor (from 1766) of rhetoric at the Collège de Lisieux, Paris, who studied for the law in his spare time and was received as avocat in 1770. He also ventured into the field of mathematics and served on the committee that developed the French Republican Calendar.

Along with Constantin François Chassebœuf de Volney (1757–1820)  Dupuis was known for developing the Christ myth theory, which argued that Christianity was an amalgamation of various ancient mythologies and that Jesus was a mythical character.

Biography
Dupuis was born in Trie-Château (in present-day Oise), the son of a schoolmaster. His precocious talents were recognized by the duc de La Rochefoucauld, who sent him to the College d'Harcourt.  Dupuis made such rapid progress that, at the age of twenty-four, he was appointed professor of rhetoric at the college of Lisieux, where he had previously passed as a Licentiate of Theology. In his hours of leisure he studied law, and in 1770 he abandoned the clerical career and became an advocate. Two university discourses which he delivered in Latin were printed, and laid the foundation of his literary fame.

In 1778, he invented a telegraph with which he was able to correspond with his friend Jean-Baptiste Fortin in Bagneux, and must be considered among the first inventors of the telegraph that was perfected by Claude Chappe. The Revolution made it necessary to destroy his machine in order to avoid suspicion.

Dupuis devoted himself to the study of astronomy (his tutor was Lalande) in connection with mythology. After fifteen years of scholarly research, he produced the magnum opus entiled "Origine de tous les Cultes, ou la Réligion Universelle" (An III [1795])., a 12-volume profusely-illustrated work in quarto or octavo format. An later abridgement (1798) saw a wider circulation amongst the reading public. In Origine, he advocated the unity of the astronomical and religious myths of all nations, an aspect of the Enlightenment's confidence in the universality of human nature. In his "Mémoire explicatif du Zodiaque, chronologique et mythologique" (1806) he similarly maintains a common origin for the astronomical and religious opinions of the Greeks, Egyptians, Chinese, Persians, and Arabians. His basis was what he saw as the perfect correspondence between the signs of the zodiac and their significations had existed in Upper Egypt at a period of between fifteen and sixteen thousand years before the present time, and that it had existed only there. Subsequently, this harmony had been disturbed by the effect of the precession of the equinoxes. He therefore ascribed the invention of the signs of the zodiac to the people who then inhabited Upper Egypt or Ethiopia. His theory as to the origin of mythology in Upper Egypt led to the expedition organized by Napoleon for the exploration of that country.

He then contributed to the Journal des savants a memoire on the origin of the constellations and on the explication of myth through astronomy, which was published as a separate fascicle in 1781. He came to the attention of Frederick the Great, who appointed him secretary but died before Dupuis could take up duties in Berlin. The chair of humanity in the Collège de France having at the same time become vacant, it was conferred on Dupuis, where he taught Latin eloquence, and in 1788 he became a member of the Académie des inscriptions et belles-lettres. He now resigned his professorship at Lisieux, and was appointed by the administrators of the department of Paris one of the four commissioners of public instruction.

After the start of the French Revolution, Dupuis fled Paris for Évreux, appalled by the massacres of September 1792, only to return when he discovered he had been elected to the National Convention, where he sat on the Council of Five Hundred, and was President of the Legislative Body after the coup d'état of 18 Brumaire. He left political life in 1802.

Christ myth theory

Dupuis believed in an impersonal God that permeated everything. Charles Bradlaugh has classified Dupuis as a pantheist.

The beginnings of the formal denial of the existence of Jesus can be traced to late 18th century France, and the works of Constantin François Chassebœuf de Volney (1757–1820) and Dupuis. Volney and Dupuis argued that Christianity was an amalgamation of various ancient mythologies and that Jesus was a mythical character.

In his book, The Origin of All Religious Worship (Origine de tous les Cultes), we find this intriguing reference to Zoroaster and Eiren. Erin/Eireann is Ireland's ancient name.
<blockquote>The God of Light and of the good principle, informs Zoroaster, that he had given to man a place of delight and abundance..

this place was called Eiren, which at the beginning was more beautiful than all the world...Nothing could equal the beauty of this delightful place.</blockquote>

Dupuis argued that ancient rituals in Syria, Egypt and Persia had influenced the Christian story which was allegorized as the histories of solar deities, such as Sol Invictus. He argued also that Jewish and Christian scriptures could be interpreted according to the solar pattern, e.g. the Fall of Man in Genesis being an allegory of the hardship caused by winter, and the resurrection of Jesus an allegory for the growth of the sun's strength in the sign of Aries at the spring equinox.

Volney argued that Abraham and Sarah were derived from Brahma and his wife Saraswati, and that Christ was related to Krishna. Volney published before Dupuis but made use of a draft version of Dupuis' work, and followed much of his argument, but at times differed from him, e.g. in arguing that the gospel stories were not intentionally created as an extended allegory grounded in solar myths, but were compiled organically when simple allegorical statements were misunderstood as history.

Reception
French Catholic librarian Jean-Baptiste Pérès wrote a satirical refutation of Dupuis's work under the title of Grand Erratum'' (1827), in which he maintains, in parallel to Dupuis's thesis that the cult of Christ is merely a cult of the Sun, that Napoleon (who, in reality, died a mere six years before the publication of the pamphlet) never existed, but was only a sun myth.

Awards

Dupuis was made a Knight of the Legion of Honour by decree on 25 April 1806.

References

External links
Brief notes
Origine, chapter ix: "An explanation of the fable, in which the Sun is worshiped under the name of Christ"
Origine, chapter xii: "“An abridged explanation of an apocalyptic work of the initiates into the mysteries of the light and of the sun, worshipped under the symbol of the vernal lamb or of the celestial ram."
Full text of Origin of all Religious Worship (Origine de tous les Cultes)

1742 births
1809 deaths
18th-century essayists
18th-century French male writers
18th-century French scientists
18th-century non-fiction writers
Chevaliers of the Légion d'honneur
Christ myth theory proponents
Academic staff of the Collège de France
Critics of Christianity
Enlightenment scientists
French male essayists
French male non-fiction writers
French rhetoricians
Lycée Saint-Louis alumni
Members of the Académie des Inscriptions et Belles-Lettres
Pantheists
People from Oise
Rhetoric theorists
Trope theorists
Writers about religion and science